The Adventure-class cruisers were a pair of scout cruisers built for the Royal Navy in the first decade of the 20th century. The sister ships spent about half of the first decade of their careers in reserve and were based in home waters when on active duty. During this time  was involved in two collisions. When the First World War began in August 1914 the ships were given coastal defence missions on the English Channel. Attentive was transferred to Ireland in mid-1915, but  remained with the Dover Patrol for another three years. They were assigned convoy escort duties in the Atlantic Ocean in 1918 before being separated when Attentive was transferred to the Mediterranean and Adventure was tasked to support the British intervention in North Russia. The sisters returned home a few months after the end of the war in November 1918 and were sold for scrap in 1920.

Background and design
In 1901–1902, the Admiralty developed scout cruisers to work with destroyer flotillas, leading their torpedo attacks and backing them up when attacked by other destroyers. It accepted four of the submissions and ordered one ship from each builder in the 1902–1903 Naval Programme and a repeat in the following year's programme.

The two ships from Armstrong Whitworth became the Adventure class. Four more 12-pounders were added to the specification in August. Their crew consisted of 289 officers and ratings. The Adventure-class ships were the only one of this group of scout cruisers to have four funnels and a clipper-style bow. The Brazilian  scout cruisers were derived from these ships.

The ships were powered by a pair of three-cylinder triple-expansion steam engines, each driving one shaft, using steam provided by a dozen Yarrow boilers. The Adventures barely exceeded their design speed when they ran their sea trials in 1905. The scout cruisers soon proved too slow for this role as faster, turbine-engined, destroyers entered service before the First World War.

The main armament of the Adventure class consisted of ten QF 12-pounder 18-cwt guns. Three guns were mounted abreast on the forecastle and the quarterdeck, with the remaining four guns positioned port and starboard amidships. They also carried eight QF three-pounder Hotchkiss guns and two single mounts for 18-inch torpedo tubes, one on each broadside.

Ships

Construction and service
The sisters were placed in reserve for two years after completion, during which time two additional 12-pounder guns were added and the 3-pounder guns were replaced with six QF 6-pounder Hotchkiss guns. They were commissioned in mid-1907 as flotilla leaders in the Home Fleet and they spent the next seven years moving on and off of active service in British waters. During this time Attentive sank one destroyer and damaged two others in collisions. In 1911–1912, they were rearmed with nine QF  Mk IV guns. When the First World War began, the sisters were assigned to coastal defence duties, in the English Channel. In mid-1915 Adventure was transferred to Irish waters to serve as the flagship there while Attentive remained with the Dover Patrol until 1918. That year she played a minor role in the Zeebrugge Raid in early 1918 and was then assigned to escort convoys to Gibraltar together with her sister. Attentive was transferred to the Mediterranean at the end of the war while Adventure was sent to the Arctic to support the unsuccessful British attempt to intervene in the Russian Civil War. The sisters returned home around the beginning of 1919 to be paid off; they were sold for scrap in 1920.

Notes

Footnotes

Bibliography

External links

Adventure class in World War I
History of the Adventure class
The Adventure class

 
Cruiser classes
Ship classes of the Royal Navy